Neil Munro (born 23 September 1967) is a British freestyle skier. He competed in the men's moguls event at the 1992 Winter Olympics.

References

External links
 

1967 births
Living people
British male freestyle skiers
Olympic freestyle skiers of Great Britain
Freestyle skiers at the 1992 Winter Olympics
Place of birth missing (living people)